Grassy Lake is a hamlet in Alberta, Canada within the Municipal District of Taber. It is located on the Crowsnest Highway (Highway 3), midway between the cities of Lethbridge to the west and Medicine Hat to the east. It was formerly incorporated as a village, dissolving into the Municipal District of Taber on July 1, 1996.

The hamlet is located in Census Division No. 2 and in the federal riding of Medicine Hat.

Grassy Lake was named for a nearby lake of the same name, which has since been drained.

Demographics 

The Municipal District of Taber's 2016 municipal census counted a population of 815 in Grassy Lake, a  change from the hamlet's 2013 municipal census population of 778.

See also 
List of communities in Alberta
List of designated places in Alberta
List of former urban municipalities in Alberta
List of hamlets in Alberta

References 

Hamlets in Alberta
Former villages in Alberta
Designated places in Alberta
Municipal District of Taber
Populated places disestablished in 1996